The year 2010 is the 9th year in the history of the Universal Reality Combat Championship, a mixed martial arts promotion based in the Philippines. In 2010 the URCC held 10 events beginning with, URCC Cebu 5: Deliverance.

Events list

URCC Cebu 5: Deliverance

URCC Cebu 5: Deliverance was an event held on January 15, 2010 at The Cebu International Convention Center in Cebu City, Philippines.

Results

URCC Baguio 2: Tribal Wars

URCC Baguio 2: Tribal Wars was an event held on February 19, 2010 at the Baguio Convention Center in Baguio, Philippines.

Results

URCC 16: Reckoning

URCC 16: Reckoning was an event held on March 27, 2010 at The A-Venue Events Hall in Makati, Metro Manila, Philippines.

Results

URCC 17: Havoc

URCC 17: Havoc was an event held on July 24, 2010 at The A-Venue Events Hall in Makati, Metro Manila, Philippines.

Results

URCC: Davao Digmaan 2

URCC: Davao Digmaan 2 was an event held on October 17, 2010 at The Garden Oases Resort & Convention Center in Davao City, Philippines.

Results

URCC: University Challenge 2010

URCC: University Challenge 2010 was an event held on September 18, 2010 at The A-Venue Events Hall in Makati, Metro Manila, Philippines.

URCC / Tribal Gear: Dutdutan Tattoo Festival 2010

URCC / Tribal Gear: Dutdutan Tattoo Festival 2010 was an event held on September 24, 2010 at The World Trade Center in Pasay, Metro Manila, Philippines.

Results

URCC: Bacolod Brawl 2010

URCC: Bacolod Brawl 2010 was an event held on October 17, 2010 at The Hotel PAGCOR in Bacolod, Philippines.

Results

URCC: Rouge Magazine's Black Tie Brawl 2010

URCC: Rouge Magazine's Black Tie Brawl 2010 was an event held on October 29, 2010 at The New World Hotel Makati in Makati, Metro Manila, Philippines.

Results

URCC 18: Relenthless

URCC 18: Relenthless was an event held on November 13, 2010 at The A-Venue Events Hall in Makati, Metro Manila, Philippines.

Results

See also
 Universal Reality Combat Championship

References

Universal Reality Combat Championship events
2010 in mixed martial arts